Taylor Maree Leach (born January 19, 1992) is an American former professional soccer player who last played as a defender for Kansas City Current in the National Women's Soccer League (NWSL).

Club career
Leach played for Swedish club Kopparbergs/Göteborg FC.

Leach made her NWSL debut in the 2020 NWSL Challenge Cup on July 8, 2020, for Utah Royals FC. She later played for Kansas City Current and retired after the 2022 NWSL season.

References

External links
 

1992 births
Living people
American women's soccer players
Soccer players from Ohio
People from Maumee, Ohio
Women's association football defenders
South Carolina Gamecocks women's soccer players
Sunnanå SK players
BK Häcken FF players
Utah Royals FC players
Damallsvenskan players
American expatriate women's soccer players
Expatriate women's footballers in Sweden
American expatriate sportspeople in Sweden
National Women's Soccer League players
Kansas City Current players